Tarzi Afshar was a 17th-century poet in Safavid Iran who wrote in the Persian and Azerbaijani languages. He is the author of a small divan of "humorous poems", written in an amalgam of Persian and Azerbaijani known as Tarzilik. Later, for some time, this type of poetry became relatively popular at the Safavid court in Isfahan. Tarzi Afshar originally hailed from Rey.

Notes

Sources
 

1679 deaths
Azerbaijani-language poets
People from Ray, Iran
Persian-language poets
17th-century writers of Safavid Iran
17th-century poets